"Send In the Clowns" is a song by Stephen Sondheim from the musical A Little Night Music.

Send In the Clowns may also refer to:

Send In the Clowns (1974 Sarah Vaughan album)
Send In the Clowns (1981 Sarah Vaughan album)
Send In the Clowns (Oceans of Sadness album)
"Send In the Clowns", a 2000 song by American band Cold on their album 13 Ways to Bleed on Stage

Television
 "Send In the Clown", an episode of the TV series Super Mario World
 "Send in the Clowns" (Cow and Chicken), a 1999 television episode
 "Send in the Clowns", an episode of the TV series Midsomer Murders

See also
 Send In the Clones (disambiguation)